

Rabbi David Elimelech Tzanger 
David Elimelech Tzanger (born Nowy Sacz, Poland 1880–1962) was a rabbi and Hasidic personality in his native Poland, Canada and Israel. Tzanger was born to parents Isaac Pinchus and Hinda Rechel Tzanger (née Kirshbaum), who were followers of the Tsanz Hasidic sect. He was a disciple of the first Bobover Rebbe - Reb Shlomo Halberstam. He was originally trained as a ritual slaughterer, however due to his extreme piety and knowledge of Jewish law he was designated as the Krakower (Crakow) Rebbe by the then Bobover Rebbe Ben Zion Halberstam. This was a prestigious position as the city of Cracow was a major centre of Hasidic Judaism. Tzanger was then sent to Canada to lead the Hasidic community there and finally to Israel where he led a community of hasidic Jews in Tel Aviv. Tzanger was buried on the Har Hamenuchot in recognition of his contribution to Judaism.

Radomsk 

On the eve of World War II, Radomsk was the third largest Hasidic dynasty in Poland, after Ger and Aleksander. In Kraków, there were more Radomsker shtiebelach than Gerrer shtiebelach.

Melitz

Rabbi Elimelech Horowitz 
Rabbi Elimelech Horowitz (1881-1942) was a Chassidic Rebbe in Cracow, the fifth of the Melitz dynasty. He was a descendant of Rabbi Naftali Zvi Horowitz of Ropshitz. He was shot dead in the Radomysl cemetery. He was the brother-in-law of Rabbi Yechezkel Holstok of Ostrovtza.

See also
Bobov Synagogue (Kraków)
History of Jews in Poland
Hasidic Judaism in Poland
Hasidic Judaism in Lithuania

References

Hasidic Judaism by city
Hasidic Judaism in Poland